The Stutz Diplomatica and later Royale were limousines produced by the Stutz Motor Car of America company in the 1970s and 1980s.

Stutz Diplomatica

The Diplomatica was a standard-wheelbase limousine based on the Cadillac DeVille. Of the seven Diplomaticas produced, all but one were purchased for use in the Kingdom of Saudi Arabia.

Stutz Royale

Three extended-wheelbase limousines designed by Paolo Martin were also produced, the latter two using the Royale name in homage to the Bugatti Royale. The first two were purchased by King Fahd of Saudi Arabia, while the third went to Omar Bongo, the President of Gabon.

References
 
 

Diplomatica